Pityopsis falcata, common names sickleleaf silkgrass and sickle-leaved golden aster, is  perennial species of flowering plant in the family Asteraceae that is native to the United States and has been introduced to Canada.

Conservation status in the United States
It is listed as endangered in Connecticut, and as a special concern species in Rhode Island.

References

Astereae
Flora of the Eastern United States
Flora of Canada